The Russian River Flag was a newspaper that covered the community of Healdsburg, California from 1868 to 1886. It was preceded by the Democratic Standard, 1865-1868, and followed by the Healdsburg Enterprise in 1886.

See also
Healdsburg Enterprise

References 

 "Nothing but News: A History of Healdsburg's Newspapers from 1860-1950," Marie Djordjevich, Russian River Recorder (Healdsburg Museum and Historical Society), Spring 2001, Issue 72.

External links
California Digital Newspaper Collection

1888 establishments in California
Healdsburg, California
Mass media in Sonoma County, California